A leadership spill of the Australian Labor Party (ALP), then the opposition party in the Parliament of Australia, was rejected on 21 October 1954.

Background
On 5 October 1954 Evatt gave an aggressive speech against 'disloyal elements' within the Labor Party, which aimed "to deflect the Labor Movement from the pursuit of established Labor objectives and ideals." The speech caused ructions within the ALP leading many to question Evatt's position.

Labor's caucus rejected by 52 to 28 votes a motion for a spill moved by Senators George Cole and James Fraser. Deputy leader Arthur Calwell and Allan Fraser would have stood for election as Leader and deputy leader respectively in the event of a spill occurring. After the ballot, Evatt insisted on counting the names for and against, which only furthered his opponents animosity.

See also
1954 Australian federal election
Australian Labor Party split of 1955

References

Australian Labor Party leadership spills
Australian Labor Party leadership spill